Nike Campbell (born 6 March 1976) is an author, finance management professional, executive producer and philanthropist born in Ukraine and based in Florida, in the United States of America.

Early Life and education 
Campbell is the second child in a family of four children. Although born in Lviv, Ukraine, her parents are Nigerian and she spent most of her growing up years in Nigeria with her maternal grandparents.

Campbell had her secondary school education at Queen's College, Lagos, after which she started her university education at the University of Lagos. She, however, relocated to the United States to complete her university education, where she obtained a Bachelor's degree in economics from Howard University. Her Master's degree is from the American University in Washington DC, where she studied International development.

Career 
Nike Campbell has experience working in the international development sector and as a budget and finance manager and fiscal director in the United States. She is an author with three published books, including two works of historical fiction. Growing up with her grandparents influenced her interest in historical fiction.

Her first historical fiction, Thread of Gold Beads, was published in 2012 by Three Magi Publishing. It tells the story of Amelia, the last daughter of King Gbehazin, and the hurdles she faced escaping from Dahomey during the French-Dahomey war. King Gbehazin was the last independent king of Dahomey. According to Campbell, Amelia's character was motivated by the life of her maternal great-grandmother.

Campbell's second work, Bury Me Come Sunday Afternoon, is a collection of short stories published in 2016 by Quramo Publishing. Its themes cut across the immigrant experience, mental health, religion, domestic violence and more.

Her third book is a historical fiction titled Saro. Saro was published in 2022 by Narrative Landscape Press. It tells the story of a king of Egba, Şiwoolu, who was captured with his wife, Dotunu, and transported to Sierra Leone before finding their way back to Abeokuta. Spirituality, the trans-Atlantic slave trade, love, betrayal, and family ties are some of the themes explored in the book.

Adaptations 
Three of Campbell's stories have been adapted as plays and short films. In 2014, Thread of Gold Beads was performed as a stage play by the Publick Playhouse for the Performing Arts in Cheverly, United States.

Two of the stories from Bury Me Come Sunday Afternoon: Apartment 24 and Losing my Religion, were adapted as short films in 2018 and 2019 respectively.

Losing my Religion was adapted in 2018. It is directed by Damilola Orimogunje (known for For Maria Ebun Pataki) and features Nollywood stars like Toyin Oshinaike, Omowunmi Dada, Fred Idehen, Ihiechineke Anthony and Brutus Richard.

In 2019, Campbell's Apartment 24 was made into a short film. It is directed by John Uche and stars Olawale Ajao, Kiki Andersen, Dumebi Egbufor and Kike Ayodeji.

Philanthropy 
Nike Campbell believes in breaking the myths about Africans and to this effect she founded the non-profit organisation, Our Paths to Greatness. Our Paths to Greatness celebrates Africans across the continent as a way to inspire others and change the negative narrative associated with Africans.

Awards/recognition 
Campbell was a finalist of the 2018 Red Hen Press Award for Fiction.

Bibliography 
 2012 – Thread of Gold Beads
 2016 – Bury Me Come Sunday Afternoon
 2022 – Saro

References 

Year of birth missing (living people)
Living people
Ukrainian women philanthropists
Ukrainian women in business